Editions des Saints Peres is an independent publishing house specialized in the publication of limited facsimile editions of literary manuscripts. Founded in 2012 by :fr:Jessica Nelson and Nicolas Tretiakow, Editions des Saints Peres has published the manuscripts of major literary figures including Charles Baudelaire, Jean Cocteau, Jean-Luc Godard, Jules Verne, Lewis Carroll, and Marcel Proust .

Editions des Saints Peres' luxury editions are limited and hand-numbered.

During a 2015 interview with lecteur.com, Jessica Nelson stated that  "in order to bring the facilities of the works back to their original state, each project requires a veritable restoration of the text and the page, it's very touching."

Manuscripts 
 2012 : Hygiene and the Assassin by Amelie Nothomb
 2013 : Froth on the Daydream by Boris Vian
 2013 : Beauty and the Beast by Jean Cocteau
 2013 : Contempt by Jean-Luc Godard
 2014 : Journey to the End of the Night by Louis Ferdinand Celine
 2014 : Twenty Thousand Leagues Under the Sea by Jules Verne
 2015 : Candide by Voltaire
 2015 : The Flowers of Evil by Charles Baudelaire
 2015 : In Search of Lost Time by Marcel Proust
 2015 : Alice's Adventures Under Ground by Lewis Carroll
 2016 : Madame Bovary by Gustave Flaubert
 2016 : The Hunchback of Notre-Dame by Victor Hugo
 2016 : The Mystery of Jean the Bird Catcher by Jean Cocteau
 2016 : Tales by Charles Perrault
 2016 : Jane Eyre by Charlotte Bronte
 2017 : Around the World in 80 Days by Jules Verne
 2017 : Alcools by Guillaume Apollinaire

Editions

References 

French companies established in 2012
Book publishing companies of France
Literary publishing companies
Manuscripts